Badabetara is a village near the river Chitrotpala, a branch of the river Mahanadi. The village belongs to the Garadpur block of Kendrapara district in the state of Odisha, India. The village Bharigola lies to the north, and the village of Naganpur to the south.

Origin of name
The name Badabetara has an interesting historical origin associated with Boita, the indigenous boat. In the distant past, people traded through the area using the indigenous boat through a near extinct river presently known as Bagi Jora. The traders, called Boitaras, settled in the area. Therefore, this habitation came to be known as Bada Boitara which gradually began to be mispronounced as Badabetara, the present name.

References

External links

Villages in Kendrapara district